The 2011 Louisiana lieutenant gubernatorial election was held on October 22, 2011 to elect the Lieutenant Governor of Louisiana. Incumbent Republican Lieutenant Governor Jay Dardenne who was elected in a 2010 special election won his bid for a full term. Dardenne was challenged by fellow Republican Billy Nungesser, President of Plaquemines Parish.

Louisiana is the only state that has a jungle primary system where all candidates appear on the same ballot, regardless of party, and voters may vote for any candidate, regardless of their party affiliation. If no candidate had received an absolute majority of the vote during the primary election on October 22, 2011, a runoff election would have been held on November 19, 2011, between the top two candidates in the primary. (California and Washington have a similar "top two primary" system).

Candidates

Republican Party
 Billy Nungesser, President of Plaquemines Parish
 Jay Dardenne, incumbent Lieutenant Governor

Jungle Primary

Polling

Results
Despite polling projecting a landslide win incumbent Lieutenant Governor Dardenne won by 6 points. Dardenne did well in the North while Nungesser did better in the south notably carrying Orleans parish, home of New Orleans. Dardenne became the first Republican lieutenant governor to be elected to a full term since Paul Hardy in 1987. Nungesser would later win the lieutenant gubernatorial election in 2015.

See also
Lieutenant Governor of Louisiana
2011 Louisiana elections

References 

Lieutenant gubernatorial
2011
October 2011 events in the United States
Louisiana